Extracurricular is a 2019 Croatian crime comedy thriller film written and directed by Ivan-Goran Vitez. It was selected as the Croatian entry for the Best International Feature Film at the 93rd Academy Awards, but it was not nominated.

Plot
A recently divorced father is told he can't see his nine-year-old daughter on her birthday, so he holds her classroom hostage with a gun and a birthday cake.

Cast
 Milivoj Beader as Vlado Mladinić
 Zlatko Burić as Drago
 Marko Cindrić as Ozren
 Filip Eldan as Goran Varga
 Frida Jakšić as Ana Mladinić
 Darko Janeš as Načelnik Gudelj

See also
 List of submissions to the 93rd Academy Awards for Best International Feature Film
 List of Croatian submissions for the Academy Award for Best International Feature Film

References

External links
 

2019 films
2019 comedy films
2019 crime thriller films
Croatian crime films
Croatian comedy films
Croatian thriller films
2010s Croatian-language films
Films set in schools
Films about hostage takings
2010s comedy thriller films